483rd or 483d may refer to:

483d Bombardment Squadron or 303d Air Refueling Squadron, inactive United States Air Force unit
483d Tactical Airlift Wing, tactical airlift and composite wing assigned to Pacific Air Forces during the Vietnam War

See also
483 (number)
483, the year 483 (CDLXXXIII) of the Julian calendar
483 BC